The Millennium Commission, a United Kingdom public body, was set up to celebrate the turn of the millennium. It used funding raised through the UK National Lottery to assist communities in marking the close of the second millennium and celebrating the start of the third. The body was wound up in 2006.

Composition 

Set up in 1993 by the National Lottery etc. Act 1993, the Commission was an independent non-departmental public body. Commissioners were appointed by the Queen on the advice of the Prime Minister; the Chair of the Commission was, for most of its life, the Secretary of State for Culture, Media and Sport, and for most of its life a second government minister was also a Commissioner. During Tessa Jowell's tenure as Chair the second Minister was Richard Caborn, as Minister for Sport, who preceded Jowell in the department by one day, and who left the department contemporaneously (when Gordon Brown became Prime Minister).

Closure 

The Commission was wound up in December 2006 and its role was transferred to the Big Lottery Fund.

Examples of projects funded 

The Commission invested over £2 billion in buildings, environmental projects, celebrations and community schemes. Funded projects include:
 Black Country Urban Forest
 Centre for Life, Newcastle upon Tyne
 Dundee Science Centre
 Eden Project, Cornwall
 Falkirk Wheel
 Glasgow Science Centre
Winchester Science Centre (formerly INTECH)
 Five Millennium piers for London River Services
 Magna Science Adventure Centre, Rotherham
Millennium Bridge, London
 Millennium Dome, London
 The Millennium Forest for Scotland project
 Millennium Greens in cities, towns and villages
 Millennium Point, Birmingham
 Millennium Seed Bank Project, West Sussex
 Millennium Stadium, Cardiff
 National Centre for Popular Music, Sheffield (closed in 2000)
 National Space Centre, Leicester
 Odyssey Centre, Belfast
 Dynamic Earth, Edinburgh
 ReDiscover, Newcastle upon Tyne (joint venture with the Wellcome Trust and the Wolfson Foundation)
 Spinnaker Tower, Portsmouth
Sheffield Winter Garden
 The Deep, Hull
 Wales Millennium Centre, Cardiff
 A number of village halls and community meeting places

Commissioners 

There were initially nine commissioners – two ministers, one appointed by the opposition, and six independents. The number of commissioners was reduced to five as the work of the commission decreased.  The final members were:

 Richard Caborn (Chair), Minister for Sport
 Floella Benjamin, actress and author
 Heather Couper, broadcaster and writer on space 
 Judith Donovan, health and safety commissioner
 Michael Heseltine, former Conservative cabinet minister

Previous commissioners

 Virginia Bottomley
 Lord Brooke of Sutton Mandeville
 Lord Clark of Windermere
 Jack Cunningham
 Matthew d'Ancona 
 Richard Scott, Earl of Dalkeith 
 Stephen Dorrell 
 Sir John Hall
 Robin Dixon, 3rd Baron Glentoran 
 Sir Simon Jenkins
 Tessa Jowell
 Lord Montague of Oxford
 Mo Mowlam
 Barbara Roche
 Baroness Scotland of Asthal
 Baron Smith of Finsbury

References

External links

 Millennium Commission website (archived)

Organizations established in 1993
Organizations disestablished in 2006
Defunct public bodies of the United Kingdom
1993 establishments in the United Kingdom
Turn of the third millennium